The canton of Montagne Basque (Basque Euskal Mendialdea) is an administrative division of the Pyrénées-Atlantiques department, southwestern France. It was created at the French canton reorganisation which came into effect in March 2015. Its seat is in Mauléon-Licharre.

Communes 
It consists of the following communes:
 
Ahaxe-Alciette-Bascassan
Aincille
Ainharp
Ainhice-Mongelos
Alçay-Alçabéhéty-Sunharette
Aldudes
Alos-Sibas-Abense
Anhaux
Arnéguy
Arrast-Larrebieu
Ascarat
Aussurucq
Banca
Barcus
Béhorléguy
Berrogain-Laruns
Bidarray
Bussunarits-Sarrasquette
Bustince-Iriberry
Camou-Cihigue
Çaro
Charritte-de-Bas
Chéraute
Espès-Undurein
Estérençuby
Etchebar
Gamarthe
Garindein
Gotein-Libarrenx
Haux
L'Hôpital-Saint-Blaise
Idaux-Mendy
Irouléguy
Ispoure
Jaxu
Lacarre
Lacarry-Arhan-Charritte-de-Haut
Laguinge-Restoue
Larrau
Lasse
Lecumberry
Lichans-Sunhar
Lichos
Licq-Athérey
Mauléon-Licharre
Menditte
Mendive
Moncayolle-Larrory-Mendibieu
Montory
Musculdy
Ordiarp
Ossas-Suhare
Ossès
Roquiague
Sainte-Engrâce
Saint-Étienne-de-Baïgorry
Saint-Jean-le-Vieux
Saint-Jean-Pied-de-Port
Saint-Martin-d'Arrossa
Saint-Michel
Sauguis-Saint-Étienne
Tardets-Sorholus
Trois-Villes
Uhart-Cize
Urepel
Viodos-Abense-de-Bas

References

Cantons of Pyrénées-Atlantiques